Batocera molitor is a species of beetle in the family Cerambycidae. It was described by Kriesche in 1915. It is known from the Andaman and Nicobar Islands.

References

Batocerini
Beetles described in 1915
Beetles of Asia